Jonathan Canter (born June 4, 1965) is a former professional tennis player from the United States.

Early years
Canter was born in Los Angeles, where his father, Stanley S. Canter, worked as a film producer. His father, who was also manager of Jimmy Connors for a time, produced films such as Greystoke: The Legend of Tarzan, Lord of the Apes, Tarzan and the Lost City and Hornets' Nest, which he also wrote.

He won the boys 16 and under singles in the 1979 Ojai Tennis Tournament. The promising junior made the quarterfinals of the 1981 US Open and the following year, he reached further quarterfinals at the US Open and French Open. His best performances however came in the doubles. With countryman Michael Kures as his partner, Canter won the boys' doubles title at the 1982 US Open, beating Australians Pat Cash and John Frawley in the final. He also made the doubles semifinals at the 1982 Wimbledon Championships, partnering Chuck Willenborg. At the same event the following year, Canter was once again a singles quarterfinalist.

Professional career
Canter never made the third round of the singles draw at a Grand Slam. He twice came close, the first time at the 1986 French Open when he squandered a two set lead over Jean-Philippe Fleurian in their second-round encounter. In the US Open that year, after coming from two sets down to defeat Tim Mayotte in his opening match, Canter was again at the wrong end of a second-round match decided in five sets, losing to Dan Goldie.

He did, however, reach the third round on four occasions in the doubles. His biggest win came during the 1990 Wimbledon Championships, where he and partner Bruce Derlin upset reigning champions John Fitzgerald and Anders Järryd.

In 1985, Canter won his only Grand Prix/ATP title, at the Melbourne Outdoor tournament. The following year, he would make it to No. 36 in the world. His best results that season were semifinal appearances at Montreal and Toronto. In Montreal, he had a win over world No. 4, Yannick Noah.

Junior Grand Slam finals

Doubles: 2 (1 title, 1 runner-up)

ATP career finals

Singles: 1 (1 title)

ATP Challenger and ITF Futures finals

Singles: 2 (0–2)

Doubles: 5 (3–2)

Performance timelines

Singles

Doubles

References

External links
 
 

1965 births
Living people
American male tennis players
Tennis people from California
US Open (tennis) junior champions
Grand Slam (tennis) champions in boys' doubles